The Online Film Critics Society Award for Best Documentary Film is an annual film award given by the Online Film Critics Society to honor the best documentary of the year.

Winners
 1997: 4 Little Girls
 1998: The Big One 
 1999: Buena Vista Social Club 
 2000: The Filth and the Fury 
 2001: Startup.com 
 2002: Bowling for Columbine 
 2003: Capturing the Friedmans 
 2004: Fahrenheit 9/11 
 2005: Grizzly Man 
 2006: An Inconvenient Truth 
 2007: The King of Kong: A Fistful of Quarters 
 2008: Man on Wire
 2009: Anvil! The Story of Anvil 
 2010: Exit Through the Gift Shop 
 2011: Cave of Forgotten Dreams 
 2012: This Is Not a Film 
 2013: The Act of Killing 
 2014: Life Itself 
 2015: The Look of Silence
 2016: O.J.: Made in America
 2017: Faces Places
 2018: Won't You Be My Neighbor?
 2019: Apollo 11
 2020: Dick Johnson Is Dead
 2021: Summer of Soul
 2022: Fire of Love

References

External links

American documentary film awards
Lists of films by award
Online Film Critics Society Awards